Shiloh (שִׁלוֹ ,שִׁילֹה, and שִׁילוֹ, variably, Šīlō) was an ancient city and sanctuary in Samaria. According to the Hebrew Bible, Shiloh was the central sanctuary of the Israelites during the pre-monarchic period, before the First Temple in Jerusalem was built. After the Israelite conquest of Canaan, the Tabernacle was moved to Shiloh, and remained there during the period of the biblical judges.

Shiloh has been positively identified with modern Khirbet Seilun, a tell known in Modern Hebrew as Tel Shiloh. It is located 31 km north of Jerusalem, in the West Bank, to the west of the modern Israeli settlement town of Shilo and to the north of the Palestinian town of Turmus Ayya. G. F. Moore has suggested identifying Bochim as Shiloh.

Etymology
The meaning of the word "Shiloh" is unclear. Sometimes, it is translated as a Messianic title that means He Whose It Is or as Pacific, Pacificator or Tranquility that refers to the Samaritan Pentateuch.

Identification
Shiloh is situated just east of the Jerusalem-Nablus road, 31 km north of Jerusalem. It was identified unambiguously with Khirbet Seilun, based on the much detailed biblical description of the site:

The Arabic name, Khirbet Seilun, preserves the ancient Hebrew name.

In the 4th century CE, Eusebius and Jerome demonstrated some awareness of Shiloh’s location as did the cartographer of the Madaba Map in the 6th century. In 1838, the American biblical scholar Edward Robinson became the first modern person to correctly identify Khirbet Seilun as Shiloh based on the biblical description of its location.

History

Bronze Age
During the Middle and Late Bronze Age Canaan, Shiloh was a walled city with a religious shrine or sanctuary.

Iron Age
Shiloh was one of the main centers of Israelite worship during the pre-monarchic period.

In the Hebrew Bible 
Shiloh is mentioned in the Books of Joshua, Judges, 1 Samuel, 1 Kings, Psalms, and Jeremiah.

Shiloh was first mentioned in the Hebrew Bible in the Book of Joshua. When the Israelites arrived in the land, they set up there the Tent of Meeting (Hebrew: Ohel-Mo'ed). There Joshua and Eleazar divided the land among the tribes who had not yet received their allocation and dealt with the allocation of cities to the Levites. Subsequently, Shiloh became one of the leading religious shrines in ancient Israel, a status it held until shortly before David's elevation of Jerusalem.

The tabernacle had been built under Moses' direction from God (Exodus 26) to house the Ark of the Covenant, also made according to Moses' instructions from God (Exodus 25). Talmudic sources state that the tent sanctuary remained at Shiloh for 369 years  until the Ark of the Covenant was taken into the battle camp at Eben-Ezer (1 Samuel 4:3–5) and captured by the Philistines at Aphek (probably Antipatris). At some point during its long stay at Shiloh, the portable tent seems to have been enclosed within a compound — a Greek "temenos". It was at Shiloh that Eli and Samuel ministered. At some point, the Tent of Meeting was moved to Gibeon, which became an Israelite holy site under David and Solomon.

The people made pilgrimages there for major feasts and sacrifices, and Judges 21 records the place as the site of an annual dance of maidens among the vineyards.

According to 1 Samuel 1–3, the sanctuary at Shiloh was administered by the Aaronite high priest Eli and his two sons, Hophni and Phinehas. According to this account, the young Samuel was dedicated by his mother Hannah there, to be raised at the shrine by the high priest, and his own prophetic ministry is presented as having begun there. Hophni and Phinehas are noted as malicious in their dealings with those who came to the shrine to offer sacrifices. It was under Eli and his sons that the Ark was lost to Israel in a battle with the Philistines at Aphek. W.F. Albright hypothesized that the Philistines also destroyed Shiloh at this time; this conclusion is disputed, but supported by traditional commentary. The place may have been destroyed later as well, though the biblical text records no such claimed destruction. Schley has claimed that the capture of the Ark and the death of Saul occurred in the same battle and that the later Davidic editors redacted the texts to make it appear as if Saul had ruled without either Tent Shrine or Ark, and thus without sacral legitimacy. This claim is disputed.

What is certain is that during the prophetic ministry of Jeremiah over three hundred years later, Shiloh had been reduced to ruins. Jeremiah used the example of Shiloh to warn the inhabitants of Judah and Jerusalem what God would do to the "place where I caused my name to dwell", warning them that their holy city, Jerusalem, like Shiloh, could fall under divine judgment.

According to Richard Elliott Friedman, the priesthood of Shiloh was the Elohist-source of the documentary hypothesis and also provided much of the material of the Deuteronomistic history, with the writer of this history (Jeremiah or somebody closely connected to him) being a descendant of these priests. If correct this would make Shiloh a major source of the history part of the Hebrew Bible/Old Testament.

Byzantine period

Jerome, in his letter to Paula and Eustochium, dated about 392–393, writes: "With Christ at our side we shall pass through Shiloh and Bethel " (Ep.46,13, PL 22, 492). The official church of Jerusalem did not schedule an annual pilgrimage to Shiloh, unlike Bethel. On the contrary, Samuel's feast was held on August 20 in the village of Masephta (Mizpah). Even the pilgrims seemingly did not visit Shiloh, for the only one that mentions its name—the sixth-century pilgrim Theodosius in De Situ Terrae Sanctae (ch. 4, CCSL 175, 116)—wrongly locates it midway between Jerusalem and Emmaus Nicopolis. The mistaken identification lasted for centuries, as appears, for example, on the Florentine map of 1300, which places Shiloh at Nabi Samwil, where the Tomb of Samuel is found. The sixth-century mosaic Madaba Map wrongly locates Shiloh east of Shechem, omitting the depiction of the church.

Early Muslim and Crusader periods
In 638 the Muslims conquered the area of Palestine. Muslim pilgrims to Shiloh mention a mosque called es-Sekineh where the memory of Jacob's and Joseph's deeds was revered. The earliest source is el-Harawi, who visited the country in 1173 when it was occupied by the Crusaders and wrote: "Seilun is the village of the mosque es-Sekineh where the stone of the Table is found". Yaqut (1225) and el-Quarwini (1308, Marmardji, 94–95), write similarly.

Archaeology

Overview
Archaeological excavations have shown that the place was already settled from about 1750 BCE (Middle Bronze II or MB II, otherwise known as MB IIB according to the Albright school); however, it is not mentioned in any pre-biblical source. A tell and many impressive remains have been unearthed from the Canaanite and Israelite eras, with habitation lasting until the 8th century BCE. During the following 12 centuries Shiloh is solely noted as a station on sojourners' routes, usually having only its religious-historical significance to offer. Archaeological excavations have revealed remains from the Roman and Persian as well as Early and Late Muslim periods.

An impressive glacis has been located and pottery, animal remains, weapons and other objects have been recovered.

History of excavations
Soundings were first made in 1922 by Aage Schmidt. A Danish team led by Hans Kjær (overseen by W.F. Albright) excavated for three seasons between the years 1926–32. A probe was done by Sven Holm-Nielson and Marie-Louise Buhl in 1963. An extensive excavation was done by Israel Finkelstein during the years 1981–84. Since 2006 further excavations have taken place there. Digs are currently run by Scott Stripling.

Finkelstein excavations
Finkelstein's work established eight strata, ranging from Middle Bronze II to the Byzantine period.

Bronze Age

Iron Age
The Iron I (Israelite) remains yielded a pillared two-storey public building near the top of the tell, the earliest attributed to Israelites. Collared rim storage jars and some cultic items were found in these buildings, pointing to usage as part of a cultic complex. More than 20 silos were uncovered from this era, included one with carbonized wheat. The destruction layer evident throughout the tell may have occurred in the wake of the Philistine victory at Eben-Ezer.

According to radiocarbon dating by Finkelstein, the site was abandoned around 1050 BCE, and then sparsely repopulated during the Iron II period. Jeremiah's admonition in the course of his temple sermon, "Go now to my place that was in Shiloh", would have occurred during this era.

Cultic site
One of the more intriguing finds was that of a heap of pottery outside the city wall before the advent of the Israelite culture (c. 1000 BCE). This pile of pottery was the remnant of a number of animal sacrifices, which were tossed over the wall after completion of the ritual and then buried. This find points to a sacral status of Shiloh during the Canaanite period, a status adopted by the Israelites. The top of the tell, where Finkelstein supposes that the tabernacle would have been placed, is now exposed bedrock, offering no clues concerning Israelite worship (aside from the adjacent storage complex).

Roman and Byzantine periods
More substantive villages emerged in the Roman and Byzantine periods.

Byzantine churches
Excavations from 2006 to 2007, carried out adjacent to and just south of Tel Shiloh, exposed elaborate mosaic floors as well as several Greek inscriptions, one explicitly referring to the site as the "village of Shiloh". During August–September 2006 archaeological excavations were carried out adjacent to the tell of Shiloh. A team led by the Archaeological Staff Officer for Judea and Samaria in Israel's Civilian Administration Antiquities Unit, performing a clean-up operation at Shiloh this summer, a belated continuation to a previous 1998 dig, discovered the mosaic floor of a large Byzantine church which was probably constructed between 380 and 420 AD.

Three Byzantine basilicas have now been uncovered. Their appearance recalls the well-known fourth-century style, with separate leaves revealing the ribbing of the back leaves, and a smooth leaf under the corner.

A structure discovered in 2006 lies under a Muslim free-standing structure known as Weli Yetaim. It seems to have suffered problems of water drainage in its western section despite the installation of run-off pipes and troughs. It appears that the solution was to raise the level of the church and the laying of a new mosaic floor. It was the older, original floor at the lower level that was revealed during the summer of 2006. The mosaic contains geometric designs, a cross, flora representations and three inscriptions, one, a dedication of a bench, the second, a salute to the residents of "Siloun" (as set in mosaic in Greek script: "CIλOYN") and the third, a general wish for good tidings. Another discovery of an addition to one of the basilicas occurred in 2013.

Ambiguous use of "Shiloh" in Hebrew Bible

Shiloh is mentioned in the Hebrew Bible in Genesis as part of the benediction given by Jacob to his son Judah: "The scepter shall not depart from Judah, nor a lawgiver from between his feet, until Shiloh comes, and unto him shall the gathering of the people be.". It could be a figure, perhaps the Messiah, or a place, as mentioned later in Judges and also in Jeremiah 41:5.

Messianic Jewish and some Christian interpretations
Messianic Judaism became attached to Shiloh as a result of this verse. Shiloh is believed to refer to Jesus by some Christians. Alternative translations have led others, including some Christians, to different conclusions.

See also
Eben-Ezer
Nob, Israel
Song of Moses
Shilo, modern Israeli settlement in the West Bank.

Notes

References

Further reading
Buhl, Marie-Louise, & Svend Holm-Nielsen, Shiloh--The Danish Excavations at Tall Sailum, Palestine, in 1926, 1929, 1932 AND 1962: The Pre-Hellenistic Remains. Copenhagen: The National Museum of Denmark, 1969.
Finkelstein, Israel, et al. Shiloh: The Archaeology of a Biblical Site. Tel Aviv, 1993.
Schley, Donald G. Shiloh: A Biblical City in Tradition and History, Sheffield, 1989, 2009. This is the only in-depth study of Shiloh from a textual, historical and archaeological perspective available; provides an exhaustive bibliography going back to 1805, which includes Albright's critical articles and insights.

External links

Rabbi Ariel Bar Tzodeck's Insight into Shiloh (a Kabbalist perspective)
Shiloh in the Jewish Encyclopedia
photos of the Mosaic from Tel Shiloh
photos of the Mosaic from Tel Shiloh "Church of the ark found in the west bank" 
Photos of Tel Shiloh
More Archeology at Tel Shiloh

Ancient Hebrew pilgrimage sites
Archaeological sites in Samaria
Archaeological sites in the West Bank
Former populated places in the State of Palestine
Hebrew Bible cities
Holy cities
Tells (archaeology)
Kingdom of Israel (united monarchy)
Eli (biblical figure)
Ancient Jewish settlements of Samaria